is a village located entirely on Minamidaitōjima in Shimajiri District, Okinawa Prefecture, Japan.

As of June 2013, the city had a population of 1,418 and a population density of 46.4 people per km².

Geography
The island is in the subtropical zone and was formed out of coral reef. With the exception of neighboring Kitadaitō, there is no inhabited land within 400 km of Minamidaitō.

Climate
Minamidaitō has a tropical rainforest climate (Köppen climate classification Af) with very warm summers and mild winters. Precipitation is significant throughout the year; the wettest month is June and the driest month is February. The island is subject to frequent typhoons.

History
Minamidaitōjima remained uninhabited until formally claimed by the Empire of Japan in 1885. In 1900, a team of pioneers from Hachijōjima, became the first human inhabitants of the island, and started the cultivation of sugar cane from 1903. Until World War II, Kitadaitōjima was owned in its entirety by Dai Nippon Sugar (now Dai Nippon Meiji Sugar). After World War II, the island was occupied by the United States. The village of Minamidaitō was established in 1946. Land reform was carried out in favor of the residents of Minamidaitō in 1964. A freight train system was established and later dismantled in favor of contemporary transportation. The island was returned to Japan in 1972.

Economy
Sugarcane is the chief product of the village, and is cultivated in the central lowlands of the island. There is also seasonal tourism and commercial fishing.

Rum is produced here. Grace Rum distillery, founded in 2004 is producing there two kinds of rum, Cor Cor red label and Cor Cor Green label, made from molasses and sugar juice respectively.

Transportation
Minami-Daito Airport, located at the east of the island, connects Minamidaitō with the nearby island of Kitadaitō and Naha, Okinawa. Okinawa Prefecture operates the airport, and classifies it as a third class airport. There is no port on the island and ships must be loaded/offloaded by crane.

Education

The village of Minamidaitō maintains a single school: Minamidaitō Elementary and Junior High School (南大東村立南大東小中学校). As of 2010 the school had 95 elementary students and 49 junior high students. The village has no high school; students leave the island to complete their secondary education.

Minamidaitō in popular culture

In 2013, a motion picture called  was released. Themes include the relationship between inhabitants of Minamidaitō and Kitadaitō and families being torn apart because of the lack of a senior high school on the island.

References

External links

Minamidaitō official website 

Villages in Okinawa Prefecture
Daitō Islands
Populated coastal places in Japan